Gamas's theorem is a result in multilinear algebra which states the necessary and sufficient conditions for a tensor symmetrized by an irreducible representation of the symmetric group  to be zero. It was proven in 1988 by Carlos Gamas. Additional proofs have been given by Pate and Berget.

Statement of the theorem 

Let  be the character of this representation.

Gamas's theorem states that the above symmetrized tensor is non-zero if and only if it is possible to partition the set of vectors  into linearly independent sets whose sizes are in bijection with the lengths of the columns of the partition .

See also
Algebraic combinatorics
Immanant
Schur polynomial

References

Algebraic combinatorics
Theorems
Multilinear algebra